Cauchari is a village and rural municipality in Jujuy Province in northwestern Argentina. It is notable for being the site of a solar park with an expected output of 300MW and, as of 2019, the biggest and highest elevation installation of this type in Latin America.

References

Populated places in Salta Province